Luisana Loreley Lopilato de la Torre (born 18 May 1987) is an Argentine actress, model and former singer. She was a member of the pop-rock band Erreway from 2002 to 2004.

Early life 
Lopilato was born to Eduardo Lopilato and Beatriz de la Torre. Her older siblings are actress  and actor Darío. She is of Spanish and Italian heritage; her great-grandfather was an immigrant from Muro Lucano, province of Potenza. She grew up in an evangelical Christian family and has stated that she is a devout Christian.

Television career

Chiquititas (1999–2001)
Lopilato made her first guest appearance in the television series  Chiquititas  in 1997 at the age of 10 and then she made her debut in the television series Mi familia es un dibujo in 1998 at the age of 11, and continued working as a child model and starring in TV commercials, which is something she started at the age of 5. In 1999, she was chosen to play her first big role, Luisana Maza in Chiquititas at the age of 12, a popular television series created by Cris Morena. That role made Lopilato famous in her country. 

Lopilato signed a contract with the Cris Morena Group, and released four Chiquititas soundtrack albums — Chiqutitias Vol. 5 (1999), Chiqutitias Vol. 6 (2000), Chiquititas Vol. 7 (2001) and Chiquititas: Rincón de Luz (2001). She reprised her role of Luisana Maza in Chiquititas, la historia, a mini–series broadcast in 2001, and Chiquititas: Rincón de Luz, a 2001 Chiquititas spin–off film. In 2000, she appeared in the film Un Amor en Moises Ville.

Rebelde Way and Erreway (2002–2006)
In 2002, Lopilato was given the role of Mía Colucci in the 2002—03 television series Rebelde Way, created by Cris Morena. She starred with Benjamín Rojas, Felipe Colombo and Camila Bordonaba, with whom she formed a pop rock band, Erreway. Erreway released three studio albums — Señales (2002), Tiempo (2003) and Memoria (2004) — which sold over 5 million copies. Señales and Tiempo earned Platinum certification in Argentina (Señales earned double Platinum) while Memoria earned Gold. Their 2004 film, Erreway: 4 Caminos, was a box–office success.

In 2007, Lopilato left Erreway and Rojas, Colombo and Bordonaba toured Spain as a trio.

It was confirmed that Lopilato would record a solo album and that she had signed with Universal Music Group.

Casados con Hijos and other work (2006–2009) 
After Rebelde Way, she received several acting offers and signed with Pol-Ka Productions, with which she made two telenovelas, Los Secretos de Papá and Los Pensionados. In 2005, Lopilato appeared in Casados con Hijos, an Argentine version of Married... with Children.

She portrayed Paola Argento, a character originally portrayed by Christina Applegate. She was nominated for a Martín Fierro Award for Best Supporting Actress. She once again worked with Cris Morena on Alma Pirata.

In 2007, Lopilato was host of Los Premios MTV Latinoamérica, Latin MTV Awards, with the former Miss Colombia Valerie Domínguez. She was nominated for an ACE Award for Best Supporting Actress for her role onstage in Arlequín, and appeared in the Martín Fierro Award-nominated television comedy El Capo. Gente magazine named Lopilato "The Face of the Year". She starred with Rodrigo González and Sabrina Garciarena in the 2008 telenovela Encandilados, made especially for cell-phones, and also starred in the theatre play La Cenicienta with Rodrigo Guirao Díaz.

From 2008 to 2009, she starred in the series Atracción x4. In 2009, Lopilato starred opposite Nicolás Cabré and Gimena Accardi in the film Papá por un Día. Her animated film, Plumíferos, which was completed in 2008, was released in February 2010.

In June 2009, FHM magazine in Spain, ranked her 86 in its annual Las 100 mujeres más sexys del mundo.

International exposure (2010–2011)
In 2010, Lopilato completed the Channel 13 TV series Alguien que me quiera, in which she played Bianca Rivera, a sweet and sensitive young woman who struggled and suffered much for love. In November 2010, FHM in Spain ranked her 17th on its annual list Las 100 mujeres más sexys del mundo.

In late 2010, Lopilato announced that she was planning to marry the Canadian singer Michael Bublé in April 2011. Having completed the recordings of Alguien Que Me Quiera, Lopilato accompanied Bublé on his Crazy Love tour.

In 2011, Lopilato made her first film outside Argentina, the Spanish thriller Predeterminados (directed by Jordi Arencón), as "Vera". In June 2011, FHM in Spain ranked her 11th on the "Las 100 mujeres más sexys del mundo list.

Lobo, Una buona stagione, En Terapia, and return to film (2012–2014)
Lopilato joined the cast of the El Trece series Lobo as a villainess, opposite Ana Linares's character (Vanesa González). In 2012, she portrayed Silvia, one of the lead roles in the Italian miniseries Una buona stagione (A good season) transmitted by RAI, which premiered during 2014.
In 2013, she played a young cancer victim in the second season of the Argentine remake of In Treatment, En terapia, starring Diego Peretti and broadcast by TV Publica. She was nominated for a Martin Fierro Award as Best Supporting Actress in a drama.

In 2014, Lopilato starred in the comedy film Las Insoladas, directed by Gustavo Taretto (known for his previous film Medianeras). After the premiere in September, she announced her next film project, Los que aman, odian, based on the book by Adolfo Bioy Casares and Silvina Ocampo.

 Variaciones Walsh, Fair Market Value (2015) 
In 2015, Lopilato returned to Argentinian TV in an episode of the mini-series Variaciones Walsh broadcast on public TV. She went to Hollywood acting in her first North American film entitled Fair Market Value; the cast included Tina Benko and Wendy Makkena. In the same year, she was invited to join Tu Cara Me Suena, a talent show, as part of the jury.

Singing career
Chiquititas–Erreway

Lopilato began her career as a singer in the TV series that launched her to fame, Chiquititas. In 2000, she participated in the album with other actors from the series. The final part of the series was premiered in 2001. After Chiquitita, the creator of the series, Cris Morena, rehired Lopilato for a new series called Rebelde Way, from which emerged Erreway, a pop group consisting of the four main actors of the series. Benjamín Rojas, Lopilato, Felipe Colombo and Camila Bordonaba were the actors chosen for the series and the group. They released three studio albums: Señales (2002), Tiempo (2003) and Memoria (2004).

Two years later, as the group dissolved, the series was sold to Spain and the success of its music lead to a fourth and fifth album, this time a compilation entitled, El Disco de Rebelde Way (2006) and Erreway en Concierto (2006), and a show in Israel in 2004.

Atracción x4
In 2008 and 2009, Lopilato was in the series Atracción x4, with her brother Darío Lopilato. The series generated another band which released two albums that received gold certification in Argentina.

Modeling career

Lopilato was the face of the underwear brand Promesse from 2006 to 2010. In 2014, she finished her work as the face of Ultimo. She appeared in several commercials in Argentina and Israel. She started modeling as a child model at the age of 7 and even before, she had done some TV commercials. She has worked for such brands as 47 Street, Nazaria Zapatos, Keff, John Foos, Ultimo , Axe, Motor Oil Underwear for Juniors, BlackBerry, Kukuloco, Rebelde Way underwear, Sugus Combinados, Pent Ten, Marcela Koury, Ona Saez Jeans, Ripley S. A, Promesse, Bubbaloo, Coca-Cola, McDonald's, Gottex, Vitamina, L'Oréal Elvive, Gillette and Alberto V5.

 Personal life 

From 2000 to 2004, she dated her co-worker from Chiquititas and Rebelde Way, Felipe Colombo.

Lopilato became engaged to Canadian singer Michael Bublé in 2009, having appeared in his music video for "Haven't Met You Yet" which was written for her. She married Bublé on 31 March 2011, in her native Argentina, with a full ceremony in April. They have four children: a son born 27 August 2013, a son born 21 January 2016, a daughter born 26 July 2018, and another daughter born 19 August 2022. Their oldest son was diagnosed with liver cancer hepatoblastoma in 2016, but has since recovered. They live in Burnaby, British Columbia, Canada.

 Filmography 
 Television 

 Theater 

 Movies 

 Videoclips 

 Awards and nominations 

Discography
 Soundtrack albums 

 1999 —  Chiquititas Vol. 5 2000 — Chiquititas Vol. 6 2001 — Chiquititas Vol. 7 2001 — Chiquititas: Rincón de Luz 2006 — Alma Pirata 2008 — Atracción x4 2009 — Atracción x4 Erreway 

 2002 — Señales 2002 — Erreway en Grand Rex 2003 — Tiempo 2003 — Nuestro Tiempo 2004 — Nuestro Tiempo 2004 — Memoria 2004 — Gira 2004 2006 — El Disco de Rebelde Way 2006 — Erreway en Concierto 2007 — Erreway presenta su caja recopilatoria''

References

External links 
 
 
 

1987 births
Living people
21st-century Argentine actresses
21st-century Argentine women singers
Actresses from Buenos Aires
Argentine emigrants to Canada
Argentine expatriates in Canada
Argentine evangelicals
Argentine female models
Argentine film actresses
Argentine mezzo-sopranos
Argentine people of Italian descent
Argentine people of Spanish descent
Argentine stage actresses
Argentine television actresses
Argentine women singers
Michael Bublé